Lions Gibraltar Football Club Women is an amateur football club in Gibraltar, currently playing in the Gibraltar Women's Football League. The club is affiliated to Lions Gibraltar.

History
The earliest known incarnation of Lions women competed in the 1999 season of the Gibraltar Women's Football League, although records before then are not known. After an 8 year absence from women's football the team returned, competing in the 2007 Women's League after merging with Tunnel Tigers, during which time they competed as Lions Tunnel Tigers. However, after finishing bottom of the league that season, the team quickly folded. The club returned as an independent entity in 2010, again finishing bottom of the league as Gibraltar United's women's team won the league, however the 2011 merger of the two men's teams also saw the women's teams merging after another hiatus from the league, returning in 2013 under its current incarnation and winning the league on their first attempt. The emergence of Lincoln Red Imps the following season saw Lions' brief control of the league quickly dissipate, until Lincoln's side folded in 2020.

Honours
Gibraltar Women's Football League
Winners: 2013–14, 2014–15, 2020–21, 2021–22, 2022–23
Runners-up: 2016–17, 2017–18, 2018–19, 2020
Women's Rock Cup
Winners: 2019, 2021–22
Runners-up: 2015, 2016, 2017

Current squad
''Correct as of 13 October 2022.

References

2013 establishments in Gibraltar
Women's football clubs in Gibraltar
Association football clubs established in 2013